Present Name- Lokanath Siva Temple (15th century.)
Address: Tala Bazar Road, Old Town, Bhubaneswar, Odisha, India.

Approach: Lokanath Siva Temple is located on the right side of the Tala Bazar Road
leading from KedarGouri lane to Lingaraja Temple and as the eastern embracement of the
Bindusagar Tank. The temple is facing towards south and the presiding deity is a Siva 
lingam at the center of a circular yonipitha. The cella measures 1.20 square metres.

Gunanidhi Panda is the chief priest of this temple.

Physical description 

The temple is surrounded by Tala Bazar Road in the east, Bindu Sagar Lake 
in the west. The temple is facing towards east.

Architectural features 

On plan, the temple has a vimana measuring 3.20.metres in length and 2.80 metres in width.
The sanctum measures 1.20 in square metres. On elevation, vimana is of pidha order measuring 
4.75 metres in height from pabhaga kalasa. From bottom to the top, the temple has bada 
(2.25 metres), gandi (1.50 metres) and mastaka (1.00 metres).

The Raha niche on three sides uniformly measures 0.53 metres in height x 0.35 metres in width with
a depth of 0.15 metres. The niches are empty.

Decorative features

Doorjamb: The doorjamb measuring 1.30 metres in height x 0.70 metres in
width is devoid of any decoration.

Building material is sandstone.vii) Construction techniques used is of dry masonry.

State of preservation 

The condition of the temple is good, because of the renovation work. The temple is repaired 
by the Orissa State Archaeology under the X and XI Finance Commission Award.
Besides the Siva-lingam there is an amorous image of Hara-Parvati is noticed inside the sanctum.

See also
 List of temples in Bhubaneswar

Reference notes 
Lesser Known Monuments of Bhubaneswar by Dr. Sadasiba Pradhan.
http://www.ignca.nic.in/
 List of Hindu temples in India#Orissa

Shiva temples in Odisha
Hindu temples in Bhubaneswar